SHA-68 is a drug which acts as a selective, non-peptide antagonist at the neuropeptide S receptor NPSR. In animal studies it reduced motor stereotypes, and blocks the stimulant action of neuropeptide S.

See also 
 Neuropeptide S receptor

References 

Fluoroarenes